Sultan Salehuddin Shah ibni Almarhum Daeng Celak (Jawi: سلطان صالح الدين شاه ابن المرحوم داءيڠ چلق ; born Raja Lumu bin Daeng Celak, 1705–1778) was the first Sultan of Selangor. He was the son of the famous Bugis warrior prince Daeng Celak. He took on the title of Sultan Sallehuddin of Selangor in 1742. The Bugis had already begun to settle on the West coast of the Malayan Peninsula towards the end of the 17th century.

Background
Salehuddin was born as Raja Lumu , the second eldest son of the Bugis warrior, Daeng Chelak and his first wife, Encik Tomita.

Sultan of Selangor
Following Raja Lumu, two other Bugis chiefs settled in the Selangor area: Raja Tua in Klang and Daeng Kemboja in Linggi, south of Lukut. Raja Lumu originally met with opposition from the sultans of Perak and Johor, as well as from the Dutch, but eventually managed to consolidate his position as sovereign. By 1770, his legitimacy was strengthened by marriage to the niece of the Sultan of Perak in November 1766.

The latter, Sultan Muhammad "invested Salehuddin with the insignia of Malay royalty and also attended the subsequent installation ceremony in Selangor". To this alliance, he soon added another, by marrying his own daughter to the Sultan of Kedah, Sultan Abdullah Mukarram Shah, the most northerly of the Western Malay Sultanates.

Marriages and issues

1) Engku Puan binti of Paduka Sri Sultan 'Ala ud-din Ri'ayat Shah bin Daeng Rilaga

Paduka Sri Sultan Ibrahim Shah ibni al-Marhum Sultan Saleh ud-din, Sultan and Yang di-Pertuan Besar of Selangor
Raja Nala ibni al-Marhum Sultan Saleh ud-din, Raja Muda
Raja Penuh binti al-Marhum Sultan Saleh ud-din

2) A daughter of prince of Perak

Raja Perak binti al-Marhum Sultan Saleh ud-din 
Raja Sharifa binti al-Marhum Sultan Saleh ud-din

References

Further reading 
R.O. Winstedt, "A History of Selangor (1680–1874)", Journal of the Malayan British Royal Asiatic Society (JMBRAS)12(3), October 1934, pp. 1–34

Salehuddin
Malaysian people of Malay descent
1705 births
Malaysian people of Bugis descent
1778 deaths
Founding monarchs
18th-century monarchs in Asia